The Women's slalom competition of the Albertville 1992 Olympics was held at Meribel.

The defending world champion was Vreni Schneider of Switzerland, who was also leader of the 1992 World Cup, while Petra Kronberger was the defending World Cup slalom champion.

Results

References 

Women's slalom
Alp
Olymp